Pheidole bicarinata is a species of ant in the genus Pheidole. It is distributed across United States, from Nebraska, Colorado, Texas, Utah and Nevada, east to New Jersey and Florida.

References

External links

bicarinata
Hymenoptera of North America
Insects described in 1870
Insects of the United States